Wagon Master is a 1950 American Western film produced and directed by John Ford and starring Ben Johnson, Harry Carey Jr., Joanne Dru, and Ward Bond. The screenplay concerns a Mormon pioneer wagon train to the San Juan River in Utah. The film inspired the US television series Wagon Train (1957–1965), which starred Ward Bond until his death in 1960. The film was a personal favorite of Ford himself, who told Peter Bogdanovich in 1967 that "Along with The Fugitive and The Sun Shines Bright, Wagon Master came closest to being what I wanted to achieve." While the critical and audience response to Wagon Master was lukewarm on its release, over the years several critics have come to view it as one of Ford's masterpieces.

Plot
The film opens with a prelude showing a murderous robbery by the outlaw Clegg family (the patriarch Shiloh (Charles Kemper) and his four "boys"). The credits then follow the prelude, which was a stylistic innovation at its time.

A Mormon wagon train led by the Elder Wiggs (Ward Bond) around 1880 has reached Crystal City, and needs a wagon master to lead it further to its destination—the San Juan River country in southeastern Utah Territory. Their wagon train is being expelled from Crystal City by the townspeople there, and at the last minute horse traders Travis Blue (Ben Johnson) and Sandy Owens (Harry Carey, Jr.) take the wagon master job.

After resuming its journey west, the train finds and adds the wagon of a medicine show troupe, who, en route to California, have become stranded without water. The onward passage of the wagon train is marked by the beginnings of romances between Travis and Denver (Joanne Dru), a female entertainer with the medicine troupe, and between Sandy and a Mormon's daughter, and also by a Mormon square dance celebrating a successful desert passage, and by a pow-wow dance with a band of Navajo. All goes well enough until the Cleggs, fleeing a posse from Crystal City, force themselves into the wagon train. The train surmounts an encounter with the posse, a washed out trail blocking the way west, and ultimately a violent confrontation with the homicidal Cleggs.

The film's conclusion leaves the wagon train and its wagon master on the verge of entry into the San Juan country. There is a final montage, which Richard Jameson characterizes as follows: "Wagon Master has scant interest in the prosaic, being preeminently a musical and a poem. ... it's the final montage that lifts the movie into another realm entirely. There are shots we've seen before—landmarks, vistas, the communal dance—but also shots we haven't. ... It's a subtler, deeper variation on the closing, transfiguring memory images of How Green Was My Valley (1941)."

Casting

Wagon Master did not use either John Wayne or Henry Fonda, the stars in many of Ford's films. The absence of any major stars of the day reduced the cost of making the film as well as its box office potential. As noted by Dennis Lim, the casting of Wagon Master was consistent with the film's focus on the emergence of a community instead of the heroic actions of individuals. Many of the cast and crew of Wagon Master were members of the "Ford stock company", having also worked on previous films directed by Ford. The principal roles were played by:
 Charles Kemper as Uncle Shiloh Clegg, the patriarch of the outlaw Clegg Family. Wagon Master was Kemper's first appearance in a film directed by Ford. Writer Dave Kehr notes that this was consistent with his role in Wagon Master as an outside, evil force.
 Ben Johnson as Travis Blue, an itinerant horse trader who becomes the wagon master for the Mormon wagon train. Johnson was a member of the Ford stock company; he was a noted horseman whose skill is featured when he gallops away from a band of Navajo.
 Harry Carey Jr. as Sandy Owens, Travis' partner. Carey was the son of Harry Carey, a superstar of silent films who worked with Ford on many films in the 1910s and 1920s. Carey's memoir, Company of Heroes: My Life as an Actor in the John Ford Stock Company (1994), provides many details of the production of Wagon Master. Carey and Peter Bogdanovich did a commentary soundtrack when Wagon Master was released to DVD in 2009.
 Ward Bond as the Mormon Elder Wiggs, the leader of the wagon train (and future star of the television series). Bond acted in many films directed by Ford; their relationship is described in the book Three Bad Men: John Ford, John Wayne, and Ward Bond (2013).
 Joanne Dru as Denver, an entertainer, and apparently a prostitute, attached to Dr. Hall's medicine show. Dru had previously starred in Ford's She Wore a Yellow Ribbon (1949).
 Alan Mowbray as Dr. A. Locksley Hall, the principal of the medicine show whose wagon joins the wagon train. "Locksley Hall" is an 1842 poem by Alfred Tennyson. Mowbray's role in Wagon Master is reminiscent of his role as Granville Thorndyke, a Shakespearean actor, in Ford's My Darling Clementine (1946).
 Jane Darwell as the Mormon Sister Ledyard. While often on camera, Darwell rarely speaks in the film; she is charged with blowing a crude hunting horn. Darwell appeared in seven of Ford's films from 1940 through 1958.
 Hank Worden as Luke Clegg. Appeared in 17 movies with John Wayne and 6 movies with Ward Bond.
 Movita Castaneda as Young Navajo Indian, who accuses Reese Clegg (Fred Libby) of attacking her.
 Ruth Clifford as Fleuretty Phyffe 
 Russell Simpson as Adam Perkins 
 Kathleen O'Malley as Prudence Perkins 
 Mickey Simpson as Jesse Clegg
 Cliff Lyons as Marshal of Crystal City

Several of the minor roles in the film were also played by notable actors such as James Arness (the future star of the long-running television series Gunsmoke) as one of the Clegg boys, Francis Ford (John Ford's elder brother, and a very successful director and actor of the silent film era) as the mute drummer of the medicine show, and Jim Thorpe (the famed Native American athlete) as a member of the Navajo band in his last film role.

Themes

Emergence of a community
Wagon Master portrays the evolution of a Mormon community in passage towards a promised Eden. Sean Axmaker wrote in 2009, "It's as gentle and warm a film as he ever made and it follows a classic Ford theme—the creation of a community in the west—through an often lighthearted tale ..." Dave Kehr wrote similarly in 1985: "Ford treats one of his central themes—the birth of a community—through a sweeping visual metaphor of movement. Seldom has the western landscape seemed such a tangible emblem of hope and freedom." The portrayal of community predominates over portrayals of individuals; thus Dennis Lim wrote, again in 2009, that "Wagon Master is at once the plainest and the fullest expression of Ford's great theme: the emergence of a community. So committed is the film to the idea of a collective hero that there is no one central character, no leading man or marquee name. Instead of Wayne or Henry Fonda, Wagon Master is filled with lesser-known but familiar faces from the Ford stock company."

A film poem
Wagon Master has been called a "film poem" or its equivalent by several critics and scholars, which connotes that the film's storyline is less important than its visual portrait of the community of the wagon train. Scott Eyman and Paul Duncan wrote in 2004 that Wagon Master "is a lyrical ballad, an affirmation of Ford's folk vision of America, where a dance or a graveside ceremony speaks more for the communally minded pioneers than all the dramatic battles in the world." Jeremy Arnold wrote,

Lindsay Anderson wrote in 1954 that, "Ford often abandons his narrative completely, to dwell on the wide and airy vistas, on riders and wagons overcoming the most formidable natural obstacles, on bowed and weary figures stumbling persistently through the dust." And Richard Jameson, in 2003:

Pacifism and arms
Filmed about four years after the end of World War II (1939–1945), Wagon Master treatment of violence was unusual, especially for a Western. In the film, the Mormons are pacifists and unarmed; this was Ford's story choice, as 19th century Mormons often took up arms. The Mormon wagon train of the film is thus vulnerable to armed threats, which include its encounters with the band of Navajo, who prove to be peaceable, and with the Clegg family, who are certainly not. Travis and Sandy are armed, but Sandy has apparently never fired a weapon at a person, and Travis claims that he's only shot "snakes". They are nonetheless able to defeat the Cleggs in a brief gunbattle precipitated by the Cleggs' murder of one of the unarmed Mormon men. Glenn Erickson writes, "Travis says he only draws on snakes, not people, and when he's forced to fight he throws his gun away afterward. That's also a feeling I felt from the men in my family, all ex-soldiers. The war was over and done with; as far as they were concerned victory and peace would last forever." Shigehiko Hasumi notes that Ford's films often show the throwing of objects at significant moments.

In his 1984 book about Ford, Lindsay Anderson discussed the "pacific (not pacifist) theme" of Wagon Master and also of Ford's cavalry trilogy of films (Fort Apache (1948), She Wore a Yellow Ribbon (1949), and Rio Grande (1950)) that were made at about the same time. Tag Gallagher wrote in 1986 that "... the Mormons are lambs, not willing to protect themselves. Without Travis they would have maintained their pacifism, Wiggs would have died, the grain would have been lost and the colony destroyed. Yet—and this compromise of ideology for practicality fascinates Ford—the Mormons will accept protection from a shepherd, thus (a trifle hypocritically?) maintaining their innocence."  As noted, however, actual Mormon wagon trains were armed and would defend themselves if necessary.

Production 

Wagon Master was produced by Argosy Pictures, which was the independent production company formed by Ford and Merian C. Cooper mostly to give Ford a control over his films that was impossible for films produced by the major film studios. Ford and Cooper were credited as co-executive producers, with Lowell J. Farrell as associate producer. Between 1946 and 1953, Ford and Cooper produced eight films through Argosy Pictures, of which Wagon Master was the fifth.

The story idea for Wagon Master emerged while Ford was directing She Wore a Yellow Ribbon (1949) on location in southern Utah. Patrick Ford, a screenwriter and Ford's son, learned the history of the Mormon Hole in the Rock expedition (1879–1880) from some local Mormon horsemen. Ford developed a story loosely based on the historical expedition. It was unusual for Ford to base his films on the stories he wrote, and it had been nearly 20 years since he'd last done so (Men Without Women  (1930)). Ford commissioned Patrick Ford and Frank S. Nugent to write the screenplay. As was typical for Ford, he changed the screenplay significantly while directing the film; he was quoted as telling Patrick Ford and Nugent that, "I liked your script, boys. In fact, I actually shot a few pages of it."

Ford had been shooting the film She Wore a Yellow Ribbon the year before (1948) in Monument Valley, near the town of Mexican Hat, Utah, close to the locations where he had also filmed Stagecoach (1939), My Darling Clementine (1946), and Fort Apache (1948). He wanted a different look for his next film and drove to Moab, Utah. Filmed in black and white on location, mainly north-east of the town of Moab, Utah in Professor Valley (with additional shooting at Spanish Valley south-west of Moab, and a few stage shots were done at Monument Valley).

Ford selected Bert Glennon as the director of photography. He'd worked with Glennon on five films between 1935 and 1939, including Stagecoach, for which both Ford and Glennon were nominated for Academy Awards. Ford chose to film Wagon Master in black and white; in 2009, Glenn Kenny wrote that the film "... reveals Bert Glennon's cinematography  for the miracle that it was/is. Watching the disc this evening I wondered if it was not, in fact, frame-by-frame one of the most gorgeous motion pictures ever shot."

Location filming was done in less than a month. Wagon Master was edited by Jack Murray, who had edited six of Ford's previous films, including all of the Argosy Pictures productions.

Musical elements

The film's score was composed by Richard Hageman, a noted conductor and composer of art songs and other musical works. Commencing with Stagecoach (1939), Hageman wrote music for seven films directed by John Ford; Wagon Master was the last. Kathryn Kalinak has written that Ford "got great work out of the people he worked with, and often those he was hardest on produced the best work of their careers. One of those was Richard Hageman, the Philadelphia Orchestra notwithstanding."

Songs are important in Wagon Master. Critic Dennis Lim has written, "Practically a musical, Wagon Master is filled with frequent song and dance interludes and accompanied by a steady stream of hymns and ballads, performed by the popular country group the Sons of the Pioneers." Filmgoers learn of Travis Blue's and Sandy Owens' decision to accept the wagon master job when Travis and Sandy break into song. Stan Jones wrote four original songs that were performed by the Sons of the Pioneers for the film's soundtrack. At its conclusion, the film incorporates a "spirited" rendition of the Mormon hymn, "Come, Come, Ye Saints". John Ford had insisted that Harry Carey Jr. lead the company of the film, which included many Mormons, in singing the hymn; the version used for the film's soundtrack was apparently recorded by the Robert Mitchell Boys Choir.

Release
The film was apparently not widely reviewed upon its 1950 release. Variety noted that "Wagon Master is a good outdoor action film, done in the best John Ford manner. That means careful character development and movement, spiced with high spots of action, good drama and leavening comedy moments."

The picture was distributed by RKO Pictures. The film recorded a loss of $65,000 and was the last co-production between Argosy and RKO.

Critical response

Film critic Tag Gallagher wrote at length about Wagon Master in his 1986 book, John Ford: the man and his films. His summary is, "That Wagon Master (1950), one of Ford's major masterpieces, grossed about a third of any of the cavalry pictures surely came as no surprise. It was a personal project, with no stars, little story, deflated drama, almost nothing to attract box office or trendy critics. Its budget was $999,370, its highest paid actor got $20,000 (Ward Bond). Almost every frame bursts with humanity, nature and cinema, quite like Rossellini's Voyage in Italy. The story, resembling the Carey-Fords of the teens more than a 1950s western, was written by Ford himself, the only such instance after 1930."

There have been a number of reviews of Wagon Master since its 2009 DVD release. Most contemporary critics appear to concur with Gallagher's view that Wagon Master is a major masterpiece. Linda Rasmussen wrote, "This wonderful film emphasizes the virtues of solidarity, sacrifice and tolerance, and shows John Ford at his most masterful, in total control of the production from the casting to the bit players to the grandeur and scope of the visual compositions. The film, with its breathtaking scenery, brilliant performances by a cast of character actors, and an engaging sense of humor, is a superlative example of the American western." While respectful of the film's accomplishments, other critics are more muted. In George N. Fenin and William K. Everson's 1973 overview, The Western: from silents to the seventies, they wrote that "Wagon Master is as close to a genuine Western film-poem as we have ever come, but attempts by Ford's admirers to enlarge it beyond that do both it and Ford a disservice." David Fear wrote in 2009, "For a modest little movie, this still has all the solid storytelling and visual majesty of Ford's classic works; scholars like Joseph McBride and Peter Bogdanovich actually think it's his masterpiece."

Mormonism and Wagon Master

The film's story is inspired by the 1879–1880 Mormon Hole in the Rock expedition, and Ford has been quoted as saying of the Mormons that "These are the people I want." The film depicts the prejudice against Mormons; the marshall in Crystal City is expelling their wagon train, and he lumps them together with other outcasts: "Mormons, Cleggses, showfolk, horse traders." Following a discussion of somewhat earlier films (Brigham Young (1940) and Bad Bascomb (1946)) that also depict Mormons sympathetically, Randy Astle and Gideon Burton write, "It is less surprising, then, to find Mormons featuring prominently in one of the most humanistic films ever made, John Ford's Wagon Master (1950). Although its scale could not equal that of Brigham Young, it deserves to be remembered as one of the greatest of Mormon films." The film ends with a chorus of perhaps the best-known Mormon hymn, "Come, Come, Ye Saints".

Home media
A region 1 DVD was released by Warner Home Video in 2009. Critic Glenn Kenny wrote of this release, "the main attraction is the film itself, buffed to a lustrous (but still grain-rich) sheen that reveals Bert Glennon's cinematography for the miracle that it was/is. Watching the disc this evening I wondered if it was not, in fact, frame-by-frame one of the most gorgeous motion pictures ever shot."
A region 2 DVD was released in Europe in 2002; it has a French language soundtrack as well as the English one. There was a release to videotape (VHS) in 1990. A colorized version was also released as a VHS tape.

In 1998, the copyrights to both the original and colored versions of the film were donated to The Library of Congress, along with an original master reel copy of the film. The reel is stored in an individual secure vault at the Packard Campus in Culpeper, Virginia in order to preserve the film for future generations.

References

Further reading

External links 
 
 
 
 

1950 films
American black-and-white films
1950 Western (genre) films
American Western (genre) films
Films directed by John Ford
Mormonism in fiction
Films shot in Utah
RKO Pictures films
1950s English-language films
1950s American films